is a town located in Watarai District, Mie Prefecture, Japan. , the town had an estimated population of 7,934 in 3903 households and a population density of 34 persons per km².

Geography
Taiki is located in eastern Kii Peninsula, in south-central Mie Prefecture. The town is bordered by Ise Bay to the east.

Neighboring municipalities
Mie Prefecture
Watarai
Minamiise
Kihoku
Ōdai

Climate
Taiki has a Humid subtropical climate (Köppen Cfa) characterized by warm summers and cool winters with light to no snowfall.  The average annual temperature in Taiki is 14.9 °C. The average annual rainfall is 2229 mm with September as the wettest month. The temperatures are highest on average in August, at around 25.2 °C, and lowest in January, at around 4.7 °C.

Demographics
Per Japanese census data, the population of Taiki has decreased steadily over the past 70 years and is now much less the it was a century ago.

History
A portion of the area of present-day Taiki was part of ancient Shima Province, but was transferred to Kii Province in 1582; the remainder was part of Ise Province. During the Edo period, large-scale forestry projects were begun.  After the Meiji restoration, the area became part of Mie Prefecture. The village of Takihara was established with the creation of the modern municipalities system on April 1, 1889. It was raised to town status in 1940 and merged with the neighboring village of Shippo in 1956 to form the town of Ōmiya. Taiki was formed on February 14, 2005 with the merger of Ōmiya with the neighboring town of Kisei and the village of Ōuchiyama.

Government
Taiki has a mayor-council form of government with a directly elected mayor and a unicameral city council of 11 members. Taiki contributes two members to the Mie Prefectural Assembly. In terms of national politics, the town is part of Mie 4th district of the lower house of the Diet of Japan.

Economy
The town serves as a commercial center for the surrounding region. Commercial fishing and the dairy industry play important roles in the local economy.

Education
Taiki has four public elementary schools and two public middle schools operated by the town government. The town does not have a high school.

Transportation

Railway
 JR Tōkai – Kisei Main Line
  -  -  -

Highway
 Kisei Expressway
 }

References

External links

Taiki official website 

Towns in Mie Prefecture
Populated coastal places in Japan
Taiki, Mie